Deh-e Khan or Deh Khan may refer to:
 Deh-e Khan, Chatrud
 Deh Khan, Shahdad